The Ciceron Seagulls United Sports and Cultural Club is a multi-sport organization based in the Ciceron neighborhood of Castries in St. Lucia. The organization is best known for their football, cricket, tennis and volleyball departments. The organization was founded in 1975.

Notable former players

References 

Ciceron Seagulls United
Association football clubs established in 1975
1975 establishments in Saint Lucia